Riacho dos Machados is a municipality in the northern region of Minas Gerais, Brazil.  The population in 2020 was 9,476.

Location

The municipality has area of 1,309 km².  The elevation is 821 meters.  It became a municipality in 1962.  The postal code (CEP) is 39529-000.
Porteirinha is part of the statistical microregion of Janaúba. It is southeast of Janaúba on MG-120. The distance to Janauba is 66 km. Neighboring municipalities are: Porteirinha, Janaúba, Francisco Sá, Grão Mogol, Rio Pardo de Minas, and Serranópolis de Minas.

The municipality contains part of the  Serra Nova State Park, created in 2003.

Economy
The main economic activities are cattle raising (20,000 head in 2006) and farming with a large production of corn (4,350 ha.) and beans (2,890 ha.) and modest production of citrus fruits, cotton, and sorghum.  In the urban area there were no financial institutions as of 2006.  There were 197 automobiles, giving a ratio of about one automobile for every 46 inhabitants.  The Gross Domestic Product was R$ 23,238,000 (2005) a year, which was mainly generated by services and agriculture. Health care was provided by 5 public health clinics.  There were no private hospitals as of 2005.

Farm Data for 2006
Producers: 1,193
Area: 165,585 ha.
Area planted in crops: 3,200 ha. 
Area of natural pasture: 17,878 ha. 
Area of woodland and forest: 134,455 ha. 
Persons occupied related to the producer: 3,829
Salaried workers not related to the producer: 329
Establishments with tractors: 24
Number of tractors: 28

Municipal Human Development Index

Riacho dos Machados was in the bottom 100 of the poorest municipalities in Minas Gerais
MHDI: .603 (2000)
State ranking: 828 out of 853 municipalities as of 2000
National ranking: 4,601 out of 5,138 municipalities as of 2000

See also
List of municipalities in Minas Gerais

References

IBGE

Municipalities in Minas Gerais